Oriol Busquets Mas (born 20 January 1999) is a Spanish professional footballer who plays as a defensive midfielder for Primeira Liga club F.C. Arouca.

Club career

Barcelona
Born in Sant Feliu de Guíxols, Girona, Catalonia, Busquets joined FC Barcelona's youth setup in 2007 at age 8, after a successful trial. After progressing through the ranks, he made his senior debut with the reserves on 29 April 2017, while still a youth, coming on as a late substitute for Alberto Perea in a 2–0 Segunda División B home win against AE Prat.

Busquets played his first game as a professional on 19 August 2017, starting in a 2–1 away victory over Real Valladolid in the Segunda División. His maiden appearance for the first team came on 29 November, when he started and played 62 minutes in the 5–0 defeat of Real Murcia in the round of 32 of the Copa del Rey.

On 9 February 2018, Busquets sustained a serious knee injury in a training session, tearing the meniscus in a fashion similar to fellow youth graduate Rafinha a year earlier. Having returned to active, he scored his first senior goal on 1 December of the same year in a 2–2 home draw with Valencia CF Mestalla. 

On 27 August 2019, Busquets joined Dutch Eredivisie club FC Twente on a one-year loan deal. His maiden appearance in top-flight football took place on 1 September when he replaced compatriot Javier Espinosa for the final 15 minutes of a 3–1 home win against FC Utrecht, where fellow Spaniards Aitor Cantalapiedra (Twente) and Adrián Dalmau (Utrecht) also scored.

Clermont
On 28 August 2021, Busquets signed with Clermont Foot on a three-year contract. He played his first Ligue 1 match on 19 September, five minutes in the 1–1 home draw with Stade Brestois 29. 

Busquets made only ten competitive appearances during his spell in France.

Arouca
Busquets moved clubs and countries again in summer 2022, joining F.C. Arouca from Portugal on a three-year deal; Clermont did not require any compensation to release him from his contract, but did retain 35% of the player's rights.

International career
Busquets won his only cap for Spain at under-21 level on 6 September 2019, playing the entire 1–0 win in Kazakhstan for the 2021 UEFA European Championship qualifiers.

Personal life
Busquets' older brother, Pol, was also a footballer. He played as a goalkeeper, and both he and their father Jordi were developed at Barcelona.

Career statistics

Honours
Barcelona
Copa del Rey: 2017–18
UEFA Youth League: 2017–18

Spain U17
UEFA European Under-17 Championship runner-up: 2016

References

External links
FC Barcelona official profile

1999 births
Living people
People from Baix Empordà
Sportspeople from the Province of Girona
Spanish footballers
Footballers from Catalonia
Association football midfielders
Segunda División players
Segunda División B players
FC Barcelona Atlètic players
FC Barcelona players
Eredivisie players
FC Twente players
Ligue 1 players
Championnat National 3 players
Clermont Foot players
Primeira Liga players
F.C. Arouca players
Spain youth international footballers
Spain under-21 international footballers
Spanish expatriate footballers
Expatriate footballers in the Netherlands
Expatriate footballers in France
Expatriate footballers in Portugal
Spanish expatriate sportspeople in the Netherlands
Spanish expatriate sportspeople in France
Spanish expatriate sportspeople in Portugal